In algebraic topology the cap product is a method of adjoining a chain of degree p with a cochain of degree q, such that q ≤ p, to form a composite chain of degree p − q.   It was introduced by Eduard Čech in 1936, and independently by Hassler Whitney in 1938.

Definition
Let X be a topological space and R a coefficient ring. The cap product is a bilinear map on singular homology and cohomology

defined by contracting a singular chain  with a singular cochain  by the formula:

Here, the notation  indicates the restriction of the simplicial map  to its face spanned by the vectors of the base, see Simplex.

Interpretation
In analogy with the interpretation of the cup product in terms of the Künneth formula, we can explain the existence of the cap product in the following way. Consider then the composition  

where we are taking tensor products of chain complexes,  is the diagonal map which induces the map

Relation with Poincaré duality

gives Poincaré duality. This also holds for (co)homology with coefficient in some other ring .

The slant product

and

to get, respectively, slant products :
 and

In case X = Y, the first one is related to the cap product by the diagonal map: . 

These ‘products’ are in some ways more like division than multiplication, which is reflected in their notation.

Equations
The boundary of a cap product is given by :

Given a map f the induced maps satisfy :

The cap and cup product are related by :

where

,   and 

An interesting consequence of the last equation is that it makes  into a right  module.

See also
Cup product
Poincaré duality
Singular homology
Homology theory

References
Hatcher, A., Algebraic Topology, Cambridge University Press (2002) . Detailed discussion of homology theories for simplicial complexes and manifolds, singular homology, etc.

Homology theory
Algebraic topology
Binary operations